Retama raetam is a species of flowering plant in the family Fabaceae, native to northern Africa from the Western Sahara to Sudan, Sicily, Israel, Sinai Peninsula, the Palestine region and Saudi Arabia, and widely naturalized elsewhere.

Taxonomy
The species was first described in 1775 by Peter Forsskål as Genista raetam. The epithet was derived from the Hebrew name from the Hebrew Bible. Retama raetam is mentioned in the Hebrew Bible, in Books of Kings and in Book of Job. the Hebrew name is "Rotem", and the translated name is "Broom tree".

. The species was transferred to Retama  by Philip Barker-Webb and Sabin Berthelot in part of a publication that has been dated to 1842. The species that occurs in the Canary Islands is now considered to be Retama rhodorhizoides, rather than R. raetam, although the latter name has been used for Canary Island plants.

References

Genisteae
Flora of North Africa
Flora of Sudan
Flora of Sicily
Flora of Sinai
Flora of Saudi Arabia
Plants described in 1775